Six Flags Great Escape Lodge & Indoor Waterpark is a resort and waterpark, located in Queensbury, New York that first opened in 2006. The resort is owned and operated by Six Flags.

History
The resort officially opened on February 7, 2006 and became the first one in the state of New York to feature an indoor waterpark. It features 200 rooms and a 38,000-square-foot water park called White Water Bay. The park is opened year-round and constant 80-degree water temperature. On the other side across US 9 is the Six Flags theme park, Great Escape. This is the second resort the company has built, the first being Lodge on the Lake next to Darien Lake that opened in 1998. In November 2012, it announced an annual event, Holiday in the Lodge, to celebrate Christmas.

Attractions inside the resort

Attractions

 Star Light Arcade
 Tranquility Spa
 Adirondack Fitness Center

Restaurants and shops
 Johnny Rockets (Formerly Trappers Adirondack Grille; replaced in June 2008)
 Johnny Rockets Sports Lounge
 Northwoods Traders
 Tall Tales Tavern
 Tall Pines Coffee Corner

White Water Bay

Attractions

 Tall Timbers Treehouse (A huge, water play area with a few slides, a dumping bucket on top, and tons of other water features)
 Tak-it-Eesi-Creek (Lazy River that goes around Tall Timber's Treehouse) 
 Avalanche (Enclosed burgundy-colored family raft ride)
 Boogie Bear Surf (FlowRider attraction)
 Lott-A-Watta-Bay (Pool adjacent to Tak-It-Eesi-Creek which originally had water basketball, but it got removed in 2008)
 Glacier Run (Enclosed blue singular tube slide)
 Snow Shoe Falls (Enclosed yellow  singular tube slide just for riders under 200 lbs)
 Tip-A-Kanu-Beach (Children's play area)
 Soakum Spring (Water spa for adults 18 or older)

Restaurants and shops
 Birch Bark Grill
 Tall Tales
 Gitchee Goomie Gift Shop
 Northwoods Traders
 Kids Klub
 Adventure Trek

References

External links
 

Six Flags
White Water Bay
The Great Escape and Hurricane Harbor
Amusement rides introduced in 2006
Hotels in New York (state)
Water parks in New York (state)
2006 establishments in New York (state)
Tourist attractions in Warren County, New York
Queensbury, New York